The 1952 Colorado gubernatorial election was held on November 4, 1952. Incumbent Republican Daniel I. J. Thornton defeated Democratic nominee John W. Metzger with 57.08% of the vote.

Primary elections
Primary elections were held on September 9, 1952.

Democratic primary

Candidates
John W. Metzger, former Colorado Attorney General
Wilkie Ham, State Senator
Ben Bezoff, State Senator

Results

Republican primary

Candidates
Daniel I. J. Thornton, incumbent Governor

Results

General election

Candidates
Major party candidates
Daniel I. J. Thornton, Republican
John W. Metzger, Democratic

Other candidates
Louis K. Stephens, Socialist Labor

Results

References

1952
Colorado
Gubernatorial